Siwakorn Muanseelao is a professional footballer from Thailand. He currently plays for Sriracha in the Thailand Premier League.

See also
Football in Thailand
List of football clubs in Thailand

References

External links
Profile at Thaipremierleague.co.th

Living people
Siwakorn Muanseelao
1985 births
Association football midfielders
Siwakorn Muanseelao